Abbas Sahab (Persian: عباس سحاب); 24 December 1921, Tafresh – 3 April 2000, Tehran) was an Iranian cartographer and founder of the Sahab Geographic and Drafting Institute. He is considered by many as the founding father of modern Persian cartography.

Among his many published works is the first atlas of the Persian Gulf.

References

External links 

 Official biography published by his company

20th-century cartographers
Iranian cartographers
People from Tafresh
1921 births
2000 deaths
20th-century Iranian people